The enzyme protoaphin-aglucone dehydratase (cyclizing) catalyzes the chemical reaction

protoaphin aglucone  xanthoaphin + H2O

This enzyme belongs to the family of lyases, specifically the hydro-lyases, which cleave carbon-oxygen bonds.  The systematic name of this enzyme class is protoaphin-aglucone hydro-lyase (cyclizing; xanthoaphin-forming). Other names in common use include protoaphin dehydratase, protoaphin dehydratase (cyclizing), and protoaphin-aglucone hydro-lyase (cyclizing).

References

 

EC 4.2.1
Enzymes of unknown structure